was the proprietor of the Uchiyama Bookstore, whose frequent visitors were both Chinese and Japanese intellectuals before World War II. Uchiyama was a Christian.

Early life 
Kanzo Uchiyama was born in 1885, in the village of Yoshii in Shitsuki District, Okayama. At the age of 12, he was sent out for his apprenticeship to Osaka. He worked for 10 years for a merchant family in Kyoto. At the age of 27, Uchiyama became a Christian.

Shanghai and the Uchiyama Bookstore 
At age 28, Kanzo moved to Shanghai, along with his wife Miki, as the overseas representative of Daigaku Megusuri Santendo (a pharmaceutical company). He established his bookstore in 1917 on North Sichuan Road. He changed the location of the bookstore to the International Settlement in Hongkou.

His store was frequented by Chinese and Japanese intellectuals, such as Lu Xun, Guo Moruo, Jun'ichirō Tanizaki, Sato Haruo and Hayashi Fumiko. Tian Han, and Chen Duxiu.

By 1932, Uchiyama had become the sole publisher of Lu Xun's works.

Later years
His wife, Miki, died in 1945. The bookstore was closed down the same year. Uchiyama returned to Japan in 1945. 
After the war, he became the first head of the Japan-China Friendship Association.

Kanzo became a friend of Wataru Kaji, subsequently receiving a will and testament following Kaji's abduction by the Canon Agency and attempted suicide.

Kanzo is buried in the Wanguo Cemetery.

See also
Chinese-Japanese relations

References

Further reading
Christopher T. Keaveney, Beyond Brushtalk: Sino-Japanese Literary Exchange in the Interwar Period, Hong Kong University Press, 2009, pages 41-43
Naoko Kato, Kaleidoscope: The Uchiyama Bookstore and its Sino-Japanese Visionaries, Hong Kong: Earnshaw Books, 2022.

1885 births
1959 deaths
Japanese booksellers
Japanese Christian pacifists
People from Okayama Prefecture